Vlad III, commonly known as Vlad the Impaler or Vlad Dracula (1428/311476/77), was Voivode of Wallachia three times between 1448 and his death in 1476/77. He is often considered one of the most important rulers in Wallachian history and a national hero of Romania.

He was the second son of Vlad Dracul, who became the ruler of Wallachia in 1436. Vlad and his younger brother, Radu, were held as hostages in the Ottoman Empire in 1442 to secure their father's loyalty. Vlad's eldest brother Mircea and their father were murdered after John Hunyadi, regent-governor of Hungary, invaded Wallachia in 1447. Hunyadi installed Vlad's second cousin, VladislavII, as the new voivode. Hunyadi launched a military campaign against the Ottomans in the autumn of 1448, and Vladislav accompanied him. Vlad broke into Wallachia with Ottoman support in October, but Vladislav returned, and Vlad sought refuge in the Ottoman Empire before the end of the year. Vlad went to Moldavia in 1449 or 1450 and later to Hungary.

Relations between Hungary and Vladislav later deteriorated, and in 1456 Vlad invaded Wallachia with Hungarian support. Vladislav died fighting against him. Vlad began a purge among the Wallachian boyars to strengthen his position. He came into conflict with the Transylvanian Saxons, who supported his opponents, Dan and Basarab Laiotă (who were Vladislav's brothers), and Vlad's illegitimate half-brother, Vlad Călugărul. Vlad plundered the Saxon villages, taking the captured people to Wallachia, where he had them impaled (which inspired his cognomen). Peace was restored in 1460.

The Ottoman Sultan, Mehmed II, ordered Vlad to pay homage to him personally, but Vlad had the Sultan's two envoys captured and impaled. In February 1462, he attacked Ottoman territory, massacring tens of thousands of Turks and Muslim Bulgarians. Mehmed launched a campaign against Wallachia to replace Vlad with Vlad's younger brother, Radu. Vlad attempted to capture the sultan at Târgoviște during the night of 1617June 1462. The Sultan and the main Ottoman army left Wallachia, but more and more Wallachians deserted to Radu. Vlad went to Transylvania to seek assistance from Matthias Corvinus, King of Hungary, in late 1462, but Corvinus had him imprisoned.

Vlad was held in captivity in Visegrád from 1463 to 1475. During this period, anecdotes about his cruelty started to spread in Germany and Italy. He was released at the request of Stephen III of Moldavia in the summer of 1475. He fought in Corvinus's army against the Ottomans in Bosnia in early 1476. Hungarian and Moldavian troops helped him to force Basarab Laiotă (who had dethroned Vlad's brother, Radu) to flee from Wallachia in November. Basarab returned with Ottoman support before the end of the year. Vlad was killed in battle before 10January 1477. Books describing Vlad's cruel acts were among the first bestsellers in the German-speaking territories. In Russia, popular stories suggested that Vlad was able to strengthen his central government only by applying brutal punishments, and many 19th-century Romanian historians adopted a similar view. Vlad's patronymic inspired the name of Bram Stoker's literary vampire, Count Dracula.

Name 

The name Dracula, which is now primarily known as the name of a vampire, was for centuries known as the sobriquet of VladIII. Diplomatic reports and popular stories referred to him as Dracula, Dracuglia, or Drakula already in the 15thcentury. He himself signed his two letters as "Dragulya" or "Drakulya" in the late 1470s. His name had its origin in the sobriquet of his father, Vlad Dracul ("Vlad the Dragon" in medieval Romanian), who received it after he became a member of the Order of the Dragon. Dracula is the Slavonic genitive form of Dracul, meaning "[the son] of Dracul (or the Dragon)". In modern Romanian, dracul means "the devil", which contributed to Vlad's reputation.

Vlad III is known as Vlad Țepeș (or Vlad the Impaler) in Romanian historiography. This sobriquet is connected to the impalement that was his favorite method of execution. Mircea the Shepherd, Voivode of Wallachia, used this sobriquet when referring to Vlad III in a letter of grant on 1April 1551.

Early life 
Vlad was the second legitimate son of Vlad II Dracul, who was himself an illegitimate son of Mircea I of Wallachia. VladII had won the moniker "Dracul" for his membership in the Order of the Dragon, a militant fraternity founded by Sigismund of Luxemburg, King of Hungary. The Order of the Dragon was dedicated to halting the Ottoman advance into Europe. Since he was old enough to be a candidate for the throne of Wallachia in 1448, Vlad's time of birth would have been between 1428 and 1431. Vlad was most probably born after his father settled in Transylvania in 1429. Historian Radu Florescu writes that Vlad was born in the Transylvanian Saxon town of Sighișoara (then in the Kingdom of Hungary), where his father lived in a three-story stone house from 1431 to 1435. Modern historians identify Vlad's mother either as a daughter or kinswoman of Alexander I of Moldavia or as his father's unknown first wife.

Vlad II Dracul seized Wallachia after the death of his half-brother Alexander I Aldea in 1436. One of his charters (which was issued on 20January 1437) preserves the first reference to Vlad III and his elder brother, Mircea, mentioning them as their father's "firstborn sons". They were mentioned in four further documents between 1437 and 1439. The last of the four charters also refers to their younger brother, Radu.

After a meeting with John Hunyadi, Voivode of Transylvania, Vlad II Dracul did not support an Ottoman invasion of Transylvania in March 1442. The Ottoman Sultan, Murad II, ordered him to come to Gallipoli to demonstrate his loyalty. Vlad and Radu accompanied their father to the Ottoman Empire, where they were all imprisoned. Vlad Dracul was released before the end of the year, but Vlad and Radu remained hostages to secure his loyalty. They were held imprisoned in the fortress of Eğrigöz (now Doğrugöz), according to contemporaneous Ottoman chronicles. Their lives were especially in danger after their father supported Vladislaus, King of Poland and Hungary, against the Ottoman Empire during the Crusade of Varna in 1444. Vlad II Dracul was convinced that his two sons would be "butchered for the sake of Christian peace," but neither Vlad nor Radu was murdered or mutilated after their father's rebellion.

Vlad Dracul again acknowledged the sultan's suzerainty and promised to pay a yearly tribute to him in 1446 or 1447. John Hunyadi (who had by then become the regent-governor of Hungary in 1446), invaded Wallachia in November 1447. The Byzantine historian Michael Critobulus wrote that Vlad and Radu fled to the Ottoman Empire, which suggests that the sultan had allowed them to return to Wallachia after their father paid homage to him. Vlad Dracul and his eldest son, Mircea, were murdered. Hunyadi made Vladislav II (son of Vlad Dracul's cousin, Dan II) the ruler of Wallachia.

Reigns

First rule 

Upon the death of his father and elder brother, Vlad became a potential claimant to Wallachia. VladislavII of Wallachia accompanied John Hunyadi, who launched a campaign against the Ottoman Empire in September 1448. Taking advantage of his opponent's absence, Vlad broke into Wallachia at the head of an Ottoman army in early October. He had to accept that the Ottomans had captured the fortress of Giurgiu on the Danube and strengthened it.

The Ottomans defeated Hunyadi's army in the Battle of Kosovo between 17and 18October. Hunyadi's deputy, Nicholas Vízaknai, urged Vlad to come to meet him in Transylvania, but Vlad refused him. VladislavII returned to Wallachia at the head of the remnants of his army. Vlad was forced to flee to the Ottoman Empire by 7December 1448.

In exile 
Vlad first settled in Edirne in the Ottoman Empire after his fall. Not long after, he moved to Moldavia, where BogdanII (his father's brother-in-law and possibly his maternal uncle) had mounted the throne with John Hunyadi's support in the autumn of 1449. After Bogdan was murdered by Peter III Aaron in October 1451, Bogdan's son, Stephen, fled to Transylvania with Vlad to seek assistance from Hunyadi. However, Hunyadi concluded a three-year truce with the Ottoman Empire on 20November 1451, acknowledging the Wallachian boyars' right to elect the successor of VladislavII if he died.

Vlad allegedly wanted to settle in Brașov (which was a centre of the Wallachian boyars expelled by VladislausII), but Hunyadi forbade the burghers to give shelter to him on 6February 1452. Vlad returned to Moldavia where Alexăndrel had dethroned Peter Aaron. The events of his life during the years that followed are unknown. He must have returned to Hungary before 3July 1456 because, on that day, Hunyadi informed the townspeople of Brașov that he had tasked Vlad with the defence of the Transylvanian border.

Second rule

Consolidation 

The circumstances and the date of Vlad's return to Wallachia are uncertain. He invaded Wallachia with Hungarian support either in April, July or August 1456. VladislavII died during the invasion. Vlad sent his first extant letter as voivode of Wallachia to the burghers of Brașov on 10September. He promised to protect them in case of an Ottoman invasion of Transylvania, but he also sought their assistance if the Ottomans occupied Wallachia. In the same letter, he stated that "when a man or a prince is strong and powerful he can make peace as he wants to; but when he is weak, a stronger one will come and do what he wants to him", showing his authoritarian personality.

Multiple sources (including Laonikos Chalkokondyles's chronicle) recorded that hundreds or thousands of people were executed at Vlad's order at the beginning of his reign. He began a purge against the boyars who had participated in the murder of his father and elder brother or whom he suspected of plotting against him. Chalkokondyles stated that Vlad "quickly effected a great change and utterly revolutionized the affairs of Wallachia" through granting the "money, property, and other goods" of his victims to his retainers. The lists of the members of the princely council during Vlad's reign also show that only two of them (Voico Dobrița and Iova) were able to retain their positions between 1457 and 1461.

Conflict with the Saxons 
Vlad sent the customary tribute to the sultan. After John Hunyadi died on 11August 1456, his elder son, Ladislaus Hunyadi became the captain-general of Hungary. He accused Vlad of having "no intention of remaining faithful" to the king of Hungary in a letter to the burghers of Brașov, also ordering them to support VladislausII's brother, DanIII, against Vlad. The burghers of Sibiu supported another pretender, a “priest of the Romanians who calls himself a Prince's son". The latter (identified as Vlad's illegitimate brother, Vlad Călugărul) took possession of Amlaș, which had customarily been held by the rulers of Wallachia in Transylvania.

Ladislaus V of Hungary had Ladislaus Hunyadi executed on 16March 1457. Hunyadi's mother, Elizabeth Szilágyi, and her brother, Michael Szilágyi, stirred up a rebellion against the king. Taking advantage of the civil war in Hungary, Vlad assisted Stephen, son of BogdanII of Moldavia, in his move to seize Moldavia in June 1457. Vlad also broke into Transylvania and plundered the villages around Brașov and Sibiu. The earliest German stories about Vlad recounted that he had carried "men, women, children" from a Saxon village to Wallachia and had them impaled. Since the Transylvanian Saxons remained loyal to the king, Vlad's attack against them strengthened the position of the Szilágyis.

Vlad's representatives participated in the peace negotiations between Michael Szilágyi and the Saxons. According to their treaty, the burghers of Brașov agreed that they would expel Dan from their town. Vlad promised that the merchants of Sibiu could freely "buy and sell" goods in Wallachia in exchange for the "same treatment" of the Wallachian merchants in Transylvania. Vlad referred to Michael Szilágyi as "his Lord and elder brother" in a letter on 1December 1457.

Ladislaus Hunyadi's younger brother, Matthias Corvinus, was elected king of Hungary on 24January 1458. He ordered the burghers of Sibiu to keep the peace with Vlad on 3March. Vlad styled himself "Lord and ruler over all of Wallachia, and the duchies of Amlaș and Făgăraș" on 20September 1459, showing that he had taken possession of both of these traditional Transylvanian fiefs of the rulers of Wallachia. Michael Szilágyi allowed the boyar Michael (an official of VladislavII of Wallachia) and other Wallachian boyars to settle in Transylvania in late March 1458. Before long, Vlad had the boyar Michael killed.

In May, Vlad asked the burghers of Brașov to send craftsmen to Wallachia, but his relationship with the Saxons deteriorated before the end of the year. According to a scholarly theory, the conflict emerged after Vlad forbade the Saxons to enter Wallachia, forcing them to sell their goods to Wallachian merchants at compulsory border fairs. Vlad's protectionist tendencies or border fairs are not documented. Instead, in 1476, Vlad emphasized that he had always promoted free trade during his reign.

The Saxons confiscated the steel that a Wallachian merchant had bought in Brașov without repaying the price to him. In response, Vlad "ransacked and tortured" some Saxon merchants, according to a letter that Basarab Laiotă (a son of DanII of Wallachia) wrote on 21January 1459. Basarab had settled in Sighișoara and laid claim to Wallachia. However, Matthias Corvinus supported DanIII (who was again in Brașov) against Vlad. DanIII stated that Vlad had Saxon merchants and their children impaled or burnt alive in Wallachia.

 
Dan III broke into Wallachia, but Vlad defeated and executed him before 22April 1460. Vlad invaded southern Transylvania and destroyed the suburbs of Brașov, ordering the impalement of all men and women who had been captured. During the ensuing negotiations, Vlad demanded the expulsion or punishment of all Wallachian refugees from Brașov. Peace had been restored before 26July 1460, when Vlad addressed the burghers of Brașov as his "brothers and friends". Vlad invaded the region around Amlaș and Făgăraș on 24August to punish the local inhabitants who had supported DanIII.

Ottoman war 

Konstantin Mihailović (who served as a janissary in the sultan's army) recorded that Vlad refused to pay homage to the sultan in an unspecified year. The Renaissance historian Giovanni Maria degli Angiolelli likewise wrote that Vlad had failed to pay tribute to the sultan for three years. Both records suggest that Vlad ignored the suzerainty of the Ottoman Sultan, Mehmed II, already in 1459, but both works were written decades after the events. Tursun Beg (a secretary in the sultan's court) stated that Vlad only turned against the Ottoman Empire when the sultan "was away on the long expedition in Trebizon" in 1461. According to Tursun Beg, Vlad started new negotiations with Matthias Corvinus, but the sultan was soon informed by his spies. Mehmed sent his envoy, the Greek Thomas Katabolinos (also known as Yunus bey), to Wallachia, ordering Vlad to come to Constantinople. He also sent secret instructions to Hamza, bey of Nicopolis, to capture Vlad after he crossed the Danube. Vlad found out the sultan's "deceit and trickery", captured Hamza and Katabolinos, and had them executed.

After the execution of the Ottoman officials, Vlad gave orders in fluent Turkish to the commander of the fortress of Giurgiu to open the gates, enabling the Wallachian soldiers to break into the fortress and capture it. He invaded the Ottoman Empire, devastating the villages along the Danube. He informed Matthias Corvinus about the military action in a letter on 11February 1462. He stated that more than "23,884 Turks and Bulgarians" had been killed at his order during the campaign. He sought military assistance from Corvinus, declaring that he had broken the peace with the sultan "for the honor" of the king and the Holy Crown of Hungary and "for the preservation of Christianity and the strengthening of the Catholic faith". The relationship between Moldavia and Wallachia had become tense by 1462, according to a letter of the Genoese governor of Kaffa.

Having learnt of Vlad's invasion, Mehmed II raised an army of more than 150,000 strong that was said to be "second in size only to the one" that occupied Constantinople in 1453, according to Chalkokondyles. The size of the army suggests that the sultan wanted to occupy Wallachia, according to a number of historians (including Franz Babinger, Radu Florescu, and Nicolae Stoicescu). On the other hand, Mehmed had granted Wallachia to Vlad's brother, Radu, before the invasion of Wallachia, showing that the sultan's principal purpose was only the change of the ruler of Wallachia.

The Ottoman fleet landed at Brăila (which was the only Wallachian port on the Danube) in May. The main Ottoman army crossed the Danube under the command of the sultan at Nikopol, Bulgaria on 4June 1462. Outnumbered by the enemy, Vlad adopted a scorched earth policy and retreated towards Târgoviște. During the night of 1617 June, Vlad broke into the Ottoman camp in an attempt to capture or kill the sultan. Either the imprisonment or the death of the sultan would have caused panic among the Ottomans, which could have enabled Vlad to defeat the Ottoman army. However, the Wallachians "missed the court of the sultan himself" and attacked the tents of the viziers Mahmud Pasha and Isaac. Having failed to attack the sultan's camp, Vlad and his retainers left the Ottoman camp at dawn. Mehmed entered Târgoviște at the end of June. The town had been deserted, but the Ottomans were horrified to discover a "forest of the impaled" (thousands of stakes with the carcasses of executed people), according to Chalkokondyles.

Tursun Beg recorded that the Ottomans suffered from the summer heat and thirst during the campaign. The sultan decided to retreat from Wallachia and marched towards Brăila. StephenIII of Moldavia hurried to Chilia (now Kiliya in Ukraine) to seize the important fortress where a Hungarian garrison had been placed. Vlad also departed for Chilia, but left behind a troop of 6,000 strong to try to hinder the march of the sultan's army, but the Ottomans defeated the Wallachians. Stephen of Moldavia was wounded during the siege of Chilia and returned to Moldavia before Vlad came to the fortress.

The main Ottoman army left Wallachia, but Vlad's brother Radu and his Ottoman troops stayed behind in the Bărăgan Plain. Radu sent messengers to the Wallachians, reminding them that the sultan could again invade their country. Although Vlad defeated Radu and his Ottoman allies in two battles during the following months, more and more Wallachians deserted to Radu. Vlad withdrew to the Carpathian Mountains, hoping that Matthias Corvinus would help him regain his throne. However, Albert of Istenmező, the deputy of the Count of the Székelys, had recommended in mid-August that the Saxons recognize Radu. Radu also made an offer to the burghers of Brașov to confirm their commercial privileges and pay them a compensation of 15,000 ducats.

Imprisonment in Hungary 

Matthias Corvinus came to Transylvania in November 1462. The negotiations between Corvinus and Vlad lasted for weeks, but Corvinus did not want to wage war against the Ottoman Empire. At the king's order, his Czech mercenary commander, John Jiskra of Brandýs, captured Vlad near Rucăr in Wallachia.

To provide an explanation for Vlad's imprisonment to Pope Pius II and the Venetians (who had sent money to finance a campaign against the Ottoman Empire), Corvinus presented three letters, allegedly written by Vlad on 7November 1462, to MehmedII, Mahmud Pasha, and Stephen of Moldavia. According to the letters, Vlad offered to join his forces with the sultan's army against Hungary if the sultan restored him to his throne. Most historians agree that the documents were forged to give grounds for Vlad's imprisonment. Corvinus's court historian, Antonio Bonfini, admitted that the reason for Vlad's imprisonment was never clarified. Florescu writes, "[T]he style of writing, the rhetoric of meek submission (hardly compatible with what we know of Dracula's character), clumsy wording, and poor Latin" are all evidence that the letters could not be written on Vlad's order. He associates the author of the forgery with a Saxon priest of Brașov.

Vlad was first imprisoned "in the city of Belgrade" (now Alba Iulia in Romania), according to Chalkokondyles. Before long, he was taken to Visegrád, where he was held for fourteen years. No documents referring to Vlad between 1462 and 1475 have been preserved. In the summer of 1475, StephenIII of Moldavia sent his envoys to Matthias Corvinus, asking him to send Vlad to Wallachia against Basarab Laiotă, who had submitted himself to the Ottomans. Stephen wanted to secure Wallachia for a ruler who had been an enemy of the Ottoman Empire, because "the Wallachians [were] like the Turks" to the Moldavians, according to his letter. According to the Slavic stories about Vlad, he was only released after he converted to Catholicism.

Third rule and death 
Matthias Corvinus recognized Vlad as the lawful prince of Wallachia, but he did not provide him with military assistance to regain his principality. Vlad settled in a house in Pest. When a group of soldiers broke into the house while pursuing a thief who had tried to hide there, Vlad had their commander executed because they had not asked his permission before entering his home, according to the Slavic stories about his life. Vlad moved to Transylvania in June 1475. He wanted to settle in Sibiu and sent his envoy to the town in early June to arrange a house for him. MehmedII acknowledged Basarab Laiotă as the lawful ruler of Wallachia. Corvinus ordered the burghers of Sibiu to give 200 golden florins to Vlad from the royal revenues on 21September, but Vlad left Transylvania for Buda in October.

Vlad bought a house in Pécs that became known as Drakula háza ("Dracula's house" in Hungarian). In January 1476 John Pongrác of Dengeleg, Voivode of Transylvania urged the people of Brașov to send to Vlad all those of his supporters who had settled in the town, because Corvinus and Basarab Laiotă had concluded a treaty. The relationship between the Transylvanian Saxons and Basarab remained tense, and the Saxons gave shelter to Basarab's opponents during the following months. Corvinus dispatched Vlad and the Serbian Vuk Grgurević to fight against the Ottomans in Bosnia in early 1476. They captured Srebrenica and other fortresses in February and March 1476. In the Bosnian campaign, Vlad once again resorted to his terror tactics, mass impaling captured Turkish soldiers and massacring civilians in conquered settlements. His troops mostly destroyed Srebrenica, Kuslat, and Zvornik.

Mehmed II invaded Moldavia and defeated StephenIII in the Battle of Valea Albă on 26July 1476. Stephen Báthory and Vlad entered Moldavia, forcing the sultan to lift the siege of the fortress at Târgu Neamț in late August, according to a letter of Matthias Corvinus. The contemporaneous Jakob Unrest added that Vuk Grgurević and a member of the noble Jakšić family also participated in the struggle against the Ottomans in Moldavia.

Matthias Corvinus ordered the Transylvanian Saxons to support Báthory's planned invasion of Wallachia on 6September 1476, also informing them that Stephen of Moldavia would also invade Wallachia. Vlad stayed in Brașov and confirmed the commercial privileges of the local burghers in Wallachia on 7October 1476. Báthory's forces captured Târgoviște on 8November. Stephen of Moldavia and Vlad ceremoniously confirmed their alliance, and they occupied Bucharest, forcing Basarab Laiotă to seek refuge in the Ottoman Empire on 16November. Vlad informed the merchants of Brașov about his victory, urging them to come to Wallachia. He was crowned before 26November.

Basarab Laiotă returned to Wallachia with Ottoman support, and Vlad died fighting against them in late December 1476 or early January 1477. In a letter written on 10January 1477, StephenIII of Moldavia related that Vlad's Moldavian retinue had also been massacred. According to the "most reliable sources", Vlad's army of about 2,000 was cornered and destroyed by a Turkish-Basarab force of 4,000 near Snagov. The exact circumstances of his death are unclear. The Austrian chronicler Jacob Unrest stated that a disguised Turkish assassin murdered Vlad in his camp. In contrast, Russian statesman Fyodor Kuritsyn –who interviewed Vlad's family after his demise– reported that the voivode was mistaken for a Turk by his own troops during battle, causing them to attack and kill him. Florescu and Raymond T. McNally commented this account by noting that Vlad had often disguised himself as a Turkish soldier as part of military ruses. According to Leonardo Botta, the Milanese ambassador to Buda, the Ottomans cut Vlad's corpse into pieces. Bonfini wrote that Vlad's head was sent to MehmedII; it was eventually placed on a high stake in Constantinople. His decapitated head allegedly was displayed and buried in Voivode Street (today Bankalar Caddesi) in Karaköy. It is rumoured that Voyvoda Han, located on Bankalar Caddesi No. 19, was the last stop of Vlad Tepeş's skull.  Local peasant traditions maintain that what was left of Vlad's corpse was later discovered in the marshes of Snagov by monks from the nearby monastery.

The place of his burial is unknown. According to popular tradition (which was first recorded in the late 19th century), Vlad was buried in the Monastery of Snagov. However, the excavations carried out by Dinu V. Rosetti in 1933 found no tomb below the supposed "unmarked tombstone" of Vlad in the monastery church. Rosetti reported: "Under the tombstone attributed to Vlad, there was no tomb. Only many bones and jaws of horses." Historian Constantin Rezachevici said Vlad was most probably buried in the first church of the Comana Monastery, which had been established by Vlad and was near the battlefield where he was killed.

Family 

Vlad had two wives, according to modern specialists. His first wife may have been an illegitimate daughter of John Hunyadi, according to historian Alexandru Simon. Vlad's second wife was Justina Szilágyi, who was a cousin of Matthias Corvinus. She was the widow of Vencel Pongrác of Szentmiklós when "Ladislaus Dragwlya" married her, most probably in 1475. She survived Vlad Dracul, and married thirdly Pál Suki, then János Erdélyi.

Vlad's eldest son, Mihnea, was born in 1462. Vlad's unnamed second son was killed before 1486. Vlad's third son, Vlad Drakwlya, unsuccessfully laid claim to Wallachia around 1495. He was the forefather of the noble Drakwla family.

Legacy

Reputation for cruelty

First records 
Stories about Vlad's brutal acts began circulating during his lifetime. After his arrest, courtiers of Matthias Corvinus promoted their spread. The papal legate, Niccolo Modrussiense, had already written about such stories to Pope PiusII in 1462. Two years later, the Pope included them in his Commentaries.

Meistersinger Michael Beheim wrote a lengthy poem about Vlad's deeds, allegedly based on his conversation with a Catholic monk who had managed to escape from Vlad's prison. The poem, called  ("Story of a Despot Called Dracula, Voievod of Wallachia"), was performed at the court of Frederick III, Holy Roman Emperor in Wiener Neustadt during the winter of 1463. According to one of Beheim's stories, Vlad had two monks impaled to assist them to go to heaven, also ordering the impalement of their donkey because it began braying after its masters' death. Beheim also accused Vlad of duplicity, stating that Vlad had promised support to both Matthias Corvinus and MehmedII but did not keep the promise.

In 1475, Gabriele Rangoni, Bishop of Eger (and a former papal legate), understood that Vlad had been imprisoned because of his cruelty. Rangoni also recorded the rumour that while in prison Vlad caught rats to cut them up into pieces or stuck them on small pieces of wood, because he was unable to "forget his wickedness". Antonio Bonfini also recorded anecdotes about Vlad in his Historia Pannonica around 1495. Bonfini wanted to justify both the removal and the restoration of Vlad by Matthias. He described Vlad as "a man of unheard cruelty and justice". Bonfini's stories about Vlad were repeated in Sebastian Münster's Cosmography. Münster also recorded Vlad's "reputation for tyrannical justice".

German stories 

Works containing the stories about Vlad's cruelty were published in Low German in the Holy Roman Empire before 1480. The stories were allegedly written in the early 1460s, because they describe Vlad's campaign across the Danube in early 1462, but they do not refer to MehmedII's invasion of Wallachia in June of the same year. They provide a detailed narration of the conflicts between Vlad and the Transylvanian Saxons, showing that they originated "in the literary minds of the Saxons".

The stories about Vlad's plundering raids in Transylvania were clearly based on an eyewitness account, because they contain accurate details (including the lists of the churches destroyed by Vlad and the dates of the raids). They describe Vlad as a "demented psychopath, a sadist, a gruesome murderer, a masochist", worse than Caligula and Nero. However, the stories emphasizing Vlad's cruelty are to be treated with caution because his brutal acts were very probably exaggerated (or even invented) by the Saxons.

The invention of movable type printing contributed to the popularity of the stories about Vlad, making them one of the first "bestsellers" in Europe. To enhance sales, they were published in books with woodcuts on their title pages that depicted horrific scenes. For instance, the editions published in Nuremberg in 1499 and in Strasbourg in 1500 depict Vlad dining at a table surrounded by dead or dying people on poles.

Slavic stories 
There are more than twenty manuscripts (written between the 15th and 18th centuries) which preserved the text of the Skazanie o Drakule voievode (The Tale about Voivode Dracula). The manuscripts were written in Russian, but they copied a text that had originally been recorded in a South Slavic language, because they contain expressions alien to the Russian language but used in South Slavic idioms (such as diavol for "evil"). The original text was written in Buda between 1482 and 1486.

The nineteen anecdotes in the Skazanie are longer than the German stories about Vlad. They are a mixture of fact and fiction, according to historian Raymond T. McNally. Almost half of the anecdotes emphasize, like the German stories, Vlad's brutality, but they also underline that his cruelty enabled him to strengthen the central government in Wallachia. For instance, the Skazanie writes of a golden cup that nobody dared to steal at a fountain because Vlad "hated stealing so violently ... that anybody who caused any evil or robbery ... did not live long", thereby promoting public order, and the German story about Vlad's campaign against Ottoman territory underlined his cruel acts while the Skazanie emphasized his successful diplomacy calling him "zlomudry" or "evil-wise". On the other hand, the Skazanie sharply criticized Vlad for his conversion to Catholicism, attributing his death to this apostasy. Some elements of the anecdotes were later added to Russian stories about Ivan the Terrible of Russia.

Assertion by modern standards 
The mass murders that Vlad carried out indiscriminately and brutally would most likely amount to acts of genocide and war crimes by current standards. Romanian defense minister Ioan Mircea Pașcu asserted that Vlad would have been condemned for crimes against humanity had he been put on trial at Nuremberg.

National hero 

The Cantacuzino Chronicle was the first Romanian historical work to record a tale about Vlad the Impaler, narrating the impalement of the old boyars of Târgoviște for the murder of his brother, Dan. The chronicle added that Vlad forced the young boyars and their wives and children to build the Poenari Castle. The legend of the Poenari Castle was mentioned in 1747 by NeofitI, Metropolitan of Ungro–Wallachia, who complemented it with the story of Meșterul Manole, who allegedly walled in his bride to prevent the crumbling of the walls of the castle during the building project. In the early 20th century, Constantin Rădulescu-Codin, a teacher in Muscel County where the castle was situated, published a local legend about Vlad's letter of grant "written on rabbit skin" for the villagers who had helped him to escape from Poenari Castle to Transylvania during the Ottoman invasion of Wallachia. In other villages of the region, the donation is attributed to the legendary Radu Negru.

Rădulescu-Codin recorded further local legends, some of which are also known from the German and Slavic stories about Vlad, suggesting that the latter stories preserved oral tradition. For instance, the tales about the burning of the lazy, the poor, and the lame at Vlad's order and the execution of the woman who had made her husband too short a shirt can also be found among the German and Slavic anecdotes. The peasants telling the tales knew that Vlad's sobriquet was connected to the frequent impalements during his reign, but they said only such cruel acts could secure public order in Wallachia.

Most Romanian artists have regarded Vlad as a just ruler and a realistic tyrant who punished criminals and executed unpatriotic boyars to strengthen the central government. Ion Budai-Deleanu wrote the first Romanian epic poem focusing on him. Deleanu's Țiganiada (Gypsy Epic) (which was published only in 1875, almost a century after its composition) presented Vlad as a hero fighting against the boyars, Ottomans, strigoi (or vampires), and other evil spirits at the head of an army of gypsies and angels. The poet Dimitrie Bolintineanu emphasized Vlad's triumphs in his Battles of the Romanians in the middle of the 19thcentury. He regarded Vlad as a reformer whose acts of violence were necessary to prevent the despotism of the boyars. One of the greatest Romanian poets, Mihai Eminescu, dedicated a historic ballad, The Third Letter, to the valiant princes of Wallachia, including Vlad. He urges Vlad to return from the grave and to annihilate the enemies of the Romanian nation:

In the early 1860s, the painter Theodor Aman depicted the meeting of Vlad and the Ottoman envoys, showing the envoys' fear of the Wallachian ruler.

Since the middle of the 19th century, Romanian historians have treated Vlad as one of the greatest Romanian rulers, emphasizing his fight for the independence of the Romanian lands. Even Vlad's acts of cruelty were often represented as rational acts serving national interest. Alexandru Dimitrie Xenopol was one of the first historians to emphasize that Vlad could only stop the internal fights of the boyar parties through his acts of terror. Constantin C. Giurescu remarked, "The tortures and executions which [Vlad] ordered were not out of caprice, but always had a reason, and very often a reason of state." Ioan Bogdan was one of the few Romanian historians who did not accept this heroic image. In his work published in 1896, Vlad Țepeș and the German and Russian Narratives, he concluded that the Romanians should be ashamed of Vlad, instead of presenting him as "a model of courage and patriotism". According to an opinion poll conducted in 1999, 4.1% of the participants chose Vlad the Impaler as one of "the most important historical personalities who have influenced the destiny of the Romanians for the better".

Vampire mythology 

The stories about Vlad made him the best-known medieval ruler of the Romanian lands in Europe. However, Bram Stoker's Dracula, which was published in 1897, was the first book to make a connection between Dracula and vampirism. Stoker had his attention drawn to the blood-sucking vampires of Romanian folklore by Emily Gerard's article about Transylvanian superstitions (published in 1885). His limited knowledge about the medieval history of Wallachia came from William Wilkinson's book entitled Account of the Principalities of Wallachia and Moldavia with Political Observations Relative to Them, published in 1820.
 
Stoker "apparently did not know much about" Vlad the Impaler, "certainly not enough for us to say that Vlad was the inspiration for" Count Dracula, according to Elizabeth Miller. For instance, Stoker wrote that Dracula had been of Székely origin only because he knew about both Attila the Hun's destructive campaigns and the alleged Hunnic origin of the Székelys. Stoker's main source, Wilkinson, who accepted the reliability of the German stories, described Vlad as a wicked man. Actually, Stoker's working papers for his book contain no references to the historical figure, the name of the character being named in all drafts but the later ones 'Count Wampyr'. Consequently, Stoker borrowed the name and "scraps of miscellaneous information" about the history of Wallachia when writing his book about Count Dracula.

Appearance and representations 
Pope Pius II's legate, Niccolò Modrussa, painted the only extant description of Vlad, whom he had met in Buda. A copy of Vlad's portrait has been featured in the "monster portrait gallery" in the Ambras Castle at Innsbruck. The picture depicts "a strong, cruel, and somehow tortured man" with "large, deep-set, dark green, and penetrating eyes", according to Florescu. The colour of Vlad's hair cannot be determined because Modrussa mentions that Vlad was black-haired, while the portrait seems to show that he had fair hair. The picture depicts Vlad with a large lower lip.

Vlad's bad reputation in the German-speaking territories can be detected in a number of Renaissance paintings. He was portrayed among the witnesses of Saint Andrew's martyrdom in a 15th-century painting, displayed in the Belvedere in Vienna. A figure similar to Vlad is one of the witnesses of Christ in the Calvary in a chapel of the St. Stephen's Cathedral in Vienna.

In popular culture 
 The play about Vlad the Impaler A Treia țeapă (The Third Stake) (1978) was written by Marin Sorescu and staged at the height of Nicolae Ceaușescu's totalitarian regime. The play focused on cruelty and ultimate failure of the absolute power of the historical Vlad Țepeș. It was translated into English in 1987 as Vlad Dracula the Impaler.
 Vlad Țepeș (1979), Romanian historical drama film directed by Doru Năstase with Ștefan Sileanu as Vlad. It portrayed Vlad in positive light.
 Hellsing (1997-2008) is a manga series by Kouta Hirano about Vlad, named Alucard, working for the Hellsing Organization to kill other vampires.
 Vlad Tepes Dracula (1997), a Swedish video game.
 Dark Prince: The True Story of Dracula (2000), American horror-war television film, which premiered on Halloween. Rudolf Martin played Vlad.
 In Assassin's Creed: Revelations (2011), the protagonist Ezio Auditore da Firenze has to find Vlad Tepes' tomb, with his skull and sword inside.
In the light novel Fate/Apocrypha (2012-2014), Vlad III appears under the title of "Lancer of Black". In this incarnation, he is a Heroic Spirit, or Servant; Vlad is summoned to fight in an event called the Great Holy Grail War,  alongside (and against) other summoned heroes. He has the ability to recreate and summon the "forest of the impaled", but also the ability to transform into a vampire, from his name’s association  with Bram Stoker’s Dracula, which he despises.
 The video game Age of Empires II: The Forgotten (2013) contains a five-chapter campaign depicting Dracula, starting with his conflict with Vladislav II, and concluding with a battle against Basarab Laiotă and other Ottoman forces.
 Vlad Tepes (played by Paul Rhys) appears in TV series Da Vinci's Demons (2013–2015), a historical fantasy drama series that presents a fictional account of Leonardo da Vinci's early life.

See also 

 Curtea Veche
 Dracula (Castlevania)

Citations

General and cited sources

Primary sources 

 Thomas M. Bohn, Adrian Gheorghe, Albert Weber (Hrsg.): Corpus Draculianum. Dokumente und Chroniken zum walachischen Fürsten Vlad dem Pfähler 1448–1650. Band 3: Die Überlieferung aus dem Osmanischen Reich. Postbyzantinische und osmanische Autoren. Harrassowitz, Wiesbaden 2013, .
 Laonikos Chalkokondyles: The Histories, Volume II, Books 6–10'' (Translated by Anthony Kaldellis) (2014). Harvard University Press. .

Secondary sources

Further reading

External links 

 Count Dracula's War on Islam, a geopolitical context to the military campaigns of Vlad the Impaler
 The Tale of DraculaRussian manuscript c. 1490, with English translation
 Original coins issued by Vlad III the Impaler
 
 
 
 

 
1420s births
1470s deaths
15th-century Romanian people
Converts to Roman Catholicism from Eastern Orthodoxy
Dracula
Former Romanian Orthodox Christians
Heads of government who were later imprisoned
House of Drăculești
Monarchs killed in action
Roman Catholic monarchs
Romanian expatriates in Hungary
Romanian Roman Catholics
Rulers of Wallachia